Scott Walter Bryant (born October 31, 1967) is a former college baseball and minor league baseball outfielder.

College career
Bryant attended the University of Texas, where he played for the Texas Longhorns baseball team.  In the 1989 College World Series, Bryant helped lead Texas to the championship game. Bryant was named to the All-Tournament Team.  That year, Bryant won the Dick Howser Trophy as the collegiate baseball player of the year.

Professional career
Bryant was chosen in the first round (20th overall) of the 1989 Major League Baseball Draft by the Cincinnati Reds. After the 1991 season, he was traded to the Chicago Cubs for Ty Griffin. He played in the minor leagues through 1998, not making the major leagues.

References

External links

1967 births
Living people
All-American college baseball players
American expatriate baseball players in Canada
American expatriate baseball players in Mexico
Baseball outfielders
Baseball players from Austin, Texas
Calgary Cannons players
Cedar Rapids Reds players
Charlotte Knights players
Chattanooga Lookouts players
Edmonton Trappers players
Iowa Cubs players
Langosteros de Cancún players
Ottawa Lynx players
Oklahoma City 89ers players
St. Paul Saints players
Tacoma Rainiers players
Texas Longhorns baseball players